is a passenger railway station located in the city of  Yokosuka, Kanagawa Prefecture, Japan, operated by the private railway company Keikyū.

Lines
Keikyū Kurihama Station is served by the Keikyū Kurihama Line and is located 4.5 rail kilometers from the junction at Horinouchi Station, and 56.8 km from the starting point of the Keikyū Main Line at Shinagawa Station in Tokyo.

Station layout
The station consists of  two elevated island platforms serving four tracks. Platform 2 is primarily used for services terminating at Keikyū Kurihama Station.

Platforms

History
Keikyū Kurihama Station opened on December 1, 1942 as the southern terminal station for the Tokyu Shōnan Line. At that time, it was named simply , however, to avoid confusion with the neighboring government-run Kurihama Station, it was renamed  on April 1, 1944. It became a station on the Keihin Electric Express Railway from 1948. The station was renamed , on November 1, 1963. A new station building was completed in April 1987, and the station renamed to its present name on June 1, 1987.

Keikyū introduced station numbering to its stations on 21 October 2010; Keikyū Kurihama Station was assigned station number KK67.

Passenger statistics
In fiscal 2019, the station was used by an average of 42,350 passengers daily. 

The passenger figures for previous years are as shown below.

Surrounding area
 Kurihama Station ( Yokosuka Line)
 Kurihama shopping district
 Perry Park

See also
 List of railway stations in Japan

References

External links

 

Railway stations in Kanagawa Prefecture
Railway stations in Japan opened in 1942
Keikyū Kurihama Line
Railway stations in Yokosuka, Kanagawa